Marriage Act 1961 may refer to:
 Marriage Act 1961 (Australia)
 Marriage Act, 1961 (South Africa)